Mazama Falls, also referred to more simply as Wells Creek Falls (though this is incorrect, as there is a Wells Creek Falls downstream), is a waterfall on Wells Creek in the U.S. state of Washington.

The falls drops  in three main tiers. Directly after this drop is a  plunge, which falls into a water-sculpted bowl.

References

Waterfalls of Washington (state)
Waterfalls of Whatcom County, Washington